Grímsnes is a fissure or crater row volcanic system located in South Iceland, a relatively small volcanic system located SE of Thingvallavatn lake east of an en echelon group of volcanic fields extending across the Reykjanes Peninsula. The elevation at its apex is 214 meters.  Tephrochronology approximates the volcano's last eruption as 3500 BC.

The individual volcanoes in the area include Kerið, a lake-filled volcanic crater.

The total volume of lava produced in the lava flows of Grímsnes has been estimated at

See also
Geography of Iceland
List of lakes of Iceland
List of volcanoes in Iceland
Volcanism of Iceland

External links
 Grímsnes in the Catalogue of Icelandic Volcanoes

 Volcano Live
 

Volcanoes of Iceland
Fissure vents
Dormant volcanoes
South Iceland Seismic Zone
Volcanic systems of Iceland
VEI-3 volcanoes